The Western Federation of Miners Union Hall is a historic building in danger of collapse in the Victor Downtown Historic District of Victor, Colorado.

The building was a meeting place for the members of Western Federation of Miners Local No. 32. In June 1904, the Colorado National Guard shot at miners taking refuge in the union hall during the Colorado Labor Wars. The building bears at least nine bullet holes from the attack.

The union deeded the hall to the Victor School District in the 1920s. It was abandoned in the 1970s and used briefly in the 1980s as a restaurant.

As of 2005, two of the five beams supporting the roof have broken and the group applied for a grant from the Colorado Historical Society to replace the roof.

In July 2008 the building was sold to a nearby shop owner. The Victor Heritage Society is working to rescue and restore the building.

References

External links 
The Victor Heritage Society
The Labor History of the Cripple Creek District

Buildings and structures in Teller County, Colorado
Buildings and structures completed in 1901
1901 establishments in Colorado
Colorado Mining Boom
History of Teller County, Colorado
Labor disputes in Colorado
Labor disputes in the United States
Miners' labor disputes in the United States